The High Plains are a subregion of the Great Plains, mainly in the Western United States, but also partly in the Midwest states of Nebraska, Kansas, and South Dakota, generally encompassing the western part of the Great Plains before the region reaches the Rocky Mountains. The High Plains are located in eastern Montana, southeastern Wyoming, southwestern South Dakota, western Nebraska, eastern Colorado, western Kansas, eastern New Mexico. The southern region of the Western High Plains ecology region contains the geological formation known as Llano Estacado which can be seen from a short distance or on satellite maps.

Name
The term "Great Plains", for the region west of about the 96th or 98th meridian and east of the Rocky Mountains, was not generally used before the early 20th century. Nevin Fenneman's 1916 study, Physiographic Subdivision of the United States, brought the term Great Plains into more widespread usage. Prior to 1916, the region was almost invariably called the High Plains, in contrast to the lower Prairie Plains of the Midwestern states. Today the term "High Plains" is usually used for a subregion instead of the whole of the Great Plains.

Geography and climate

Due to low moisture and high elevation, the High Plains commonly experiences wide ranges and extremes in temperature. This is the world record for the greatest temperature change in 24 hours. The region is known for the steady, and sometimes intense, winds that prevail from the west. The winds add a considerable wind chill factor in the winter. The development of wind farms in the High Plains is one of the newest areas of economic development.

The High Plains are anomalously high in elevation. An explanation has recently been proposed to explain this high elevation. As the Farallon plate was subducted into the mantle beneath the region, water trapped in hydrous minerals in the descending slab was forced up into the lower crust above. Within the crust this water caused the hydration of dense garnet and other phases into lower density amphibole and mica minerals. The resulting increase in crustal volume raised the elevation about one mile.

Flora
Typical plant communities of the region are shortgrass prairie, prickly pear cacti and scrub. Sagebrush steppe is also present, particularly in high and dry areas closer to the Rocky Mountains.

Economy
Agriculture in the forms of cattle ranching and the growing of wheat, corn, and sunflowers is the primary economic activity in the region. The aridity of the region necessitates either dryland farming methods or irrigation; much water for irrigation is drawn from the underlying Ogallala Aquifer, which makes it possible to grow water-intensive crops such as corn, which the region's aridity would otherwise not support. Some areas of the High Plains have significant petroleum and natural gas deposits.

The combination of oil, natural gas, and wind energy along with plentiful underground water, has allowed some areas (such as West Texas) to sustain a range of economic activity, including occasional industry. For example, the ASARCO refinery in Amarillo, Texas has been in operation since 1924 due to the plentiful and inexpensive natural gas and water that are needed in metal ore refining.

Demographics
The High Plains has one of the lowest population densities of any region in the continental United States; Wyoming, for example, has the second lowest population density in the country after Alaska. In contrast to the stagnant population growth in the northern and western High Plains, cities in west Texas have shown sustained growth; Amarillo and Lubbock both have populations near or above 200,000 and continue to grow. Smaller towns, on the other hand, often struggle to sustain their population.

Major cities and towns

Alliance, Nebraska
Amarillo, Texas
Aurora,Colorado
Benkelman, Nebraska
Colby, Kansas
Chadron, Nebraska
Chappell, Nebraska
Cheyenne, Wyoming
Clovis, New Mexico
Colorado Springs, Colorado
Denver, Colorado
Dodge City, Kansas
Fort Morgan, Colorado
Garden City, Kansas
Goodland, Kansas
Gering, Nebraska
Grant, Nebraska
Greeley, Colorado
Guymon, Oklahoma
Hays, Kansas
Hobbs, New Mexico
Imperial, Nebraska
Kimball, Nebraska
La Junta, Colorado
Lamar, Colorado
Las Vegas, New Mexico
Liberal, Kansas
Lubbock, Texas
Midland, Texas
Odessa, Texas
Ogallala, Nebraska
Pecos, Texas
Pine Ridge, South Dakota
Porcupine, South Dakota
Portales, New Mexico
Roswell, New Mexico
Sidney, Nebraska
Santa Rosa, New Mexico
Scottsbluff, Nebraska
Sterling, Colorado
Tucumcari, New Mexico
Ulysses, Kansas
Vaughn, New Mexico
Willard, Colorado

Gallery

See also

Altiplano
Dust storm
Flora of the Great Plains (North America)
Great American Desert
List of ecoregions in the United States (EPA)
Llano Estacado
North American Prairies Province
Shortgrass prairie
Steppe
Temperate grasslands, savannas, and shrublands—Biome
Texas High Plains AVA, wine region in the Texas section of the High Plains
Tibetan Plateau
Western short grasslands
Wind power in Texas

References

External links

High Plains Regional Climate Center High Plains climatological resources
High Plains information - U.S. Department of the Interior (with map)
Trains on the High Plains
Texas counties map showing the ecoregion

Grasslands of the North American Great Plains
Temperate grasslands, savannas, and shrublands in the United States
Ecoregions of the United States
Flora of the United States
Flora of Texas
Regions of the Western United States
Regions of Colorado
Regions of Kansas
Regions of Montana
Regions of Nebraska
Regions of North Dakota
Regions of South Dakota
Regions of Oklahoma
Regions of Texas
Regions of Wyoming
High
Physiographic sections
Nearctic ecoregions